Zodiac and Swastika: How Astrology Guided Hitler's Germany is a 1968 book by Wilhelm Theodor H. Wulff (27 March 1892 - 9 June 1979). It was released in 1973 in the United States by Coward, McCann & Geoghegan and in the United Kingdom by Arthur Barker Limited of London. The English edition has a foreword by the historian Walter Laqueur.

The historian Nicholas Goodrick-Clarke takes the book as evidence that Wulff was consulted by Heinrich Himmler in the last weeks of the war. However, Goodrick-Clarke does not deal with Wulff's claim that as early as 1943 he got the assignment to locate Benito Mussolini, who had disappeared after being ousted from power.

Wulff claims that Arthur Nebe and Walter Schellenberg had assigned him various astrological tasks. He also mentions that they had used pendulum dowsers like Ludwig Straniak for similar purposes.

See also
 Nazism and occultism

References

Further reading 

 W. Wulff. Zodiac and Swastika: How Astrology Guided Hitler's Germany. Coward, McCann & Geoghegan, 1973. ,  
 Daniel Hermsdorf. Saturn Hitler. Banken, Astrologie, Kabbala und die Bilderwelt des Dritten Reichs. filmdenken Verlag, 2016. . Info (German)
 Peter Levenda. Unholy Alliance: A History of Nazi Involvement With the Occult.
 Nicholas Goodrick-Clarke. The Occult Roots of Nazism.

1968 non-fiction books
1973 non-fiction books
20th-century history books
Astrological texts
Books about Nazism
Books about the far right
German non-fiction books
History books about Nazi Germany
Occultism in Nazism
Coward-McCann books